Kathy Davis is an American sociologist who serves as a senior research fellow at Vrije Universiteit Amsterdam. Her work has been influential for her sociological approaches to feminist theory and body politics.

Career and research 
Davis is one of the foremost contemporary theorists on a feminist approach to the practice of cosmetic surgery. Her 1995 book Reshaping the Female Body was innovative in its application of sociological research methods to the female patients who undergo cosmetic surgery. She has since been quoted as an expert on the subject by Cosmopolitan, The New Yorker, and the Financial Times.

Selected books 

 Reshaping the Female Body (1995)
 The Making of Our Bodies, Ourselves: How Feminism Travels Across Borders (2007)

Awards and honors 

 2008 Joan Kelly Memorial Prize from the American Historical Association for The Making of Our Bodies, Ourselves (2007)
 2008 Distinguished Book Award from the Section on the Sociology of Sex and Gender at the American Sociological Association for The Making of Our Bodies, Ourselves (2007)
 2008 Eileen Basker Memorial Prize from the Society for Medical Anthropology for The Making of Our Bodies, Ourselves (2007)

References 

21st-century American women scientists
Academic staff of Vrije Universiteit Amsterdam
Year of birth missing (living people)
Living people
American women sociologists
21st-century American women writers
20th-century American women writers
American expatriates in the Netherlands